Androetas of Tenedos was a geographer of ancient Greece of uncertain date. He was the author of a work The Circumnavigation of Marmara (Περίπλους τῆς Προποντίδος), which was referenced by the scholiast on Apollonius of Rhodes. This work is now lost, and nothing more is known of him.

Notes

Ancient Greek geographers
Ancient Greek writers known only from secondary sources